Andriy Mykolayovych Yarmolenko (born 23 October 1989) is a Ukrainian professional footballer who plays as a winger or forward for Emirati UAE Pro League club Al Ain and captains the Ukraine national team.

Yarmolenko has been a full international for Ukraine since 2009, scoring 45 goals in 112 matches and playing at UEFA Euro 2012, Euro 2016, and Euro 2020.

Early life
Yarmolenko's parents, native Ukrainians, were originally from Smolianka village, Kulykivka Raion, Chernihiv Oblast. After their marriage, Valentyna and Mykola Yarmolenko moved to Leningrad (modern-day Saint Petersburg) where Andriy was born in 1989. He has a younger sister. After a period of three years (after the collapse of the Soviet Union), the family moved back to their native country and settled in the city of Chernihiv.

His mother recollected that Andriy began to play with the ball from the age of 4–5 years. "In the beginning he did not even have a proper ball, so had to play with a self-made one. We were poor and real football was a luxury in those times". Yarmolenko was noticed by Mykola Lypoviy who invited him to football school (Youth Sports School "Yunist" in Chernihiv) and became his first coach.

Club career

Early career
Yarmolenko is a graduate of the Chernihiv Youth Sports School "Yunist". He joined the Dynamo Kyiv Youth Academy at age of 13. However, he returned to Chernihiv after a year being unable to meet physical requirements in training. Before his move to FC Dynamo Kyiv in 2007, he played for Yunist Chernihiv, Desna Chernihiv, Lokomotyv Kyiv, Vidradnyi Kyiv and again Yunist Chernihiv

Desna Chernihiv
In the summer 2006, from Yunist Chernihiv, he joined to Desna Chernihiv, the main club in Chernihiv, under the coach Oleksandr Tomakh. Here he played in the season 2006–07 in Ukrainian First League, where he made nine appearances and scored four goals.

FC Dynamo 2 Kyiv
In 2007, Yarmolenko signed a five-year contract with Ukrainian club Dynamo Kyiv, where he joined its second team, Dynamo-2, which plays in lower leagues, for a couple of seasons. The talented youngster was praised as the "new Andriy Shevchenko" by journalists, who noted his qualities of good physique, shot and especially his speed. The then vice-president of Dynamo, Yozhef Sabo, also praised the youngster, saying, "Yarmolenko has all the makings to become a top-level player."

Dynamo Kyiv

On 11 May 2008, Yarmolenko debuted for Dynamo's first team in an away match against Vorskla Poltava and scored the winning goal in Kyiv's 1–2 victory. He scored 7 goals in 21 games in his first season and 11 in 19 in his second. He is now regularly used as a left or centre forward.

Feud with Taras Stepanenko
In a match in October 2015, Yarmolenko committed a dangerous challenge which almost broke Shakhtar Donetsk player Taras Stepanenko's leg. The two reconciled after the game and exchanged jerseys, but afterwards Yarmolenko threw Stepanenko's shirt on the ground while he thanked the Dynamo fans. In the
Shakhtar–Dynamo derby in April 2016, after the former won 3–0, Stepanenko stepped in front of the Dynamo fans kissing his Shakhtar badge. In a brawl that escalated, Yarmolenko kicked Stepanenko to the ground.

Borussia Dortmund
On 28 August 2017, Yarmolenko signed a four-year contract with Borussia Dortmund. On 10 September 2017, Yarmolenko made his debut for Dortmund as a substitute in the 79-minute against Freiburg. He then got his first start for Dortmund against Tottenham Hotspur in a Champions League fixture, where he scored Dortmund's only goal in the 3–1 defeat.

West Ham United

On 11 July 2018, Yarmolenko signed for Premier League club West Ham United on a four-year contract for an undisclosed fee. He made his debut on 12 August in a 4–0 defeat by Liverpool. Making his first start for West Ham on 16 September, he scored his first two goals for the club in a 3–1 away win against Everton, the club's first Premier League win of the 2018–19 season. Yarmolenko suffered an Achilles tear on 20 October 2018 in a 1–0 loss against Tottenham Hotspur, which ruled him out for the remainder of the season.

Yarmolenko returned to the first team squad for the start of the 2019–20 season. On 31 August 2019, he scored his first goal since his return from injury, doubling West Ham's lead with a left-footed volley in a 2–0 win over Norwich City. He scored again in West Ham's next home match in the Premier League, opening the scoring in their 2–0 defeat of Manchester United. In December 2019 he tore his adductor muscle and had still not returned to playing when football was suspended due to the COVID-19 pandemic in March 2020. He returned to training in May 2020 and on 1 July 2020, in his second appearance since 2019, he scored the winning goal against Chelsea in a 3–2 win.

On 25 November 2021, Yarmolenko scored against Rapid Wien at the Allianz Stadion and provided the penalty for the 2–0 away win for West Ham in the UEFA Europa League group stage. Following the Russian invasion of Ukraine in February 2022, Yarmolenko was given time off by manager David Moyes. He returned on 13 March, substituting an injured Michail Antonio and scoring the opening goal in a 2–1 victory over Aston Villa. Four days later, Yarmolenko scored an extra-time winner for West Ham in their 2–1 aggregate win over Spanish club Sevilla in the Europa League round of 16, allowing West Ham to progress to a European quarter-final for the first time since 1981. In May 2022, West Ham announced that Yarmolenko would be allowed to leave at the end of his current contract in June 2022.

Al-Ain
On 13 July 2022, Yarmolenko signed for the United Arab Emirates club Al-Ain on a one-year contract.

International career
On 11 August 2007 Yarmolenko represented Ukraine under-19 team in an away exhibition game against Japan, winning 1–0. He also participated in the 2008 UEFA European Under-19 Championship qualification.

After the qualification on 10 October 2008, Yarmolenko was invited to the under-21 squad which played against the Netherlands. He later participated in qualification and finals of the 2011 UEFA European Under-21 Football Championship.

On 5 September 2009, in the 2010 FIFA World Cup qualification game against Andorra, Yarmolenko made his first senior appearance for Ukraine and scored in a 5–0 win. On 2 September 2011, in an international friendly against Uruguay in Kharkiv, Yarmolenko set a national team record by scoring 14 seconds into the match, the fastest time in which a Ukraine national team player has scored a goal.

Yarmolenko scored a hat-trick on 15 November 2014, netting all of Ukraine's goals in a 3–0 victory away to Luxembourg in UEFA Euro 2016 qualifying. In November 2015, Yarmolenko scored in both legs of Ukraine's 3–1 play-off victory over Slovenia to qualify the nation for Euro 2016 final stages. Yarmolenko was subsequently included in Ukraine's squad for Euro 2016, where he played in all three matches as Ukraine failed to score and finished bottom of the group. Yarmolenko scored against Netherlands at Johan Cruyff Arena in Amsterdam and against North Macedonia at Arena Națională in Bucharest for UEFA Euro 2020 and he has been elected Star of the Match.

On 1 September 2021, Yarmolenko played his 100th game for Ukraine, in a  2022 World Cup qualification game against Kazakhstan. On 12 October 2021 he scored against Bosnia and Herzegovina at Arena Lviv in Lviv and was voted player of the match.

On 5 June 2022, Yarmolenko scored an own goal in Ukraine's defeat to Wales in a qualification game for the 2022 FIFA World Cup. The only goal of the game, he deflected a free-kick by Gareth Bale past goalkeeper, Heorhiy Bushchan as Wales qualified for their first World Cup since 1958. The decisive goal was later awarded to Bale at the end of June.

Outside of professional football
Yarmolenko has three sons with wife Inna.
 
In 2020, Dmitry Adehiro created a mural with the image of Yarmolenko, during the reconstruction of the building of the Yunost Youth Sports School, just beside the Yunist Stadium in Chernihiv.

On 7 October 2021, together with Igor Cheredinov (the trainer of Olena Kostevych), he was elected an honorary citizen of Chernihiv.

In November 2021, a competition for the Andriy Yarmolenko Cup took place in the city of Chernihiv at the Yunist Stadium.

In February 2022, Yarmolenko gave £75,000 to the Armed Forces of Ukraine to help defend the country in the wake of Russia's invasion. He also flew to the Ukraine border to rescue his wife and child after they fled the country following the invasion, according to former Ukrainian international Andriy Shevchenko. Chernihiv mayor Vladyslav Atroshenko and the governor of the Chernihiv Oblast Vyacheslav Chaus thanked Yarmolenko personally for his efforts.

Yarmolenko helped save Roman Yaremchuk's wife's parents. The striker of the national team of Ukraine and Benfica, currently playing for Club Brugge (Belgium), Roman Yaremchuk told how his wife's parents were able to be taken out of Chernihiv with the help of Andriy Yarmolenko. "I turned to Andriy Yarmolenko, knowing that he was from Chernihiv, and said, "Help me as much as you can, thank you." Of course, Andriy responded to my request and two days later they were taken away. The situation was quite difficult," Yaremchuk said.

In March 2022, Yarmolenko after the winner for West Ham over Spanish club Sevilla in the Europa League, he gave West Ham shirt to fan holding Ukraine flag and Mark Noble was in tears as Hammers beat Sevilla to reach Europa League quarter-finals on famous night.

In May 2022, Yarmolenko presented an ambulance to his hometown Chernihiv, sending it from London.

Career statistics

Club

International

As of match played 1 June 2022. Ukraine score listed first, score column indicates score after each Yarmolenko goal.

Honours
Dynamo Kyiv
Ukrainian Premier League: 2008–09, 2014–15, 2015–16
Ukrainian Cup: 2013–14, 2014–15
Ukrainian Super Cup: 2009, 2011, 2016

Individual
Best Young Player of Ukraine: 2010, 2011
Ukrainian Premier League Footballer of the Year: 2011, 2014
Ukrainian Footballer of the Year: 2013, 2014, 2015, 2017
Ukrainian Premier League Player of the Year: 2014–15, 2015–16, 2016–17
Football Stars of Ukraine – Best UPL player: 2016
UEFA awards 100 caps

See also
List of men's footballers with 100 or more international caps

References

External links

 Andriy Yarmolenko at West Ham United F.C. (archived)
 Andriy Yarmolenko at FC Dynamo Kyiv (archived)
 Euro 2012: Ukraine profile – Andriy Yarmolenko at The Guardian
 
 
 
 
 
 

1989 births
Living people
Footballers from Saint Petersburg
Ukrainian footballers
Ukrainian Premier League players
Ukrainian First League players
SDYuShOR Desna players
FC Desna Chernihiv players
FC Yunist Chernihiv players
FC Dynamo Kyiv players
Russian emigrants to Ukraine
Association football forwards
Association football midfielders
FC Dynamo-2 Kyiv players
Ukrainian Cup top scorers
Ukrainian Premier League top scorers
Borussia Dortmund players
West Ham United F.C. players
Al Ain FC players
Bundesliga players
Ukraine youth international footballers
Ukraine under-21 international footballers
Ukraine international footballers
UEFA Euro 2012 players
UEFA Euro 2016 players
UEFA Euro 2020 players
Ukrainian expatriate footballers
Expatriate footballers in Germany
Ukrainian expatriate sportspeople in Germany
Expatriate footballers in England
Ukrainian expatriate sportspeople in England
Expatriate footballers in the United Arab Emirates
Ukrainian expatriate sportspeople in the United Arab Emirates
Premier League players
FIFA Century Club
UAE Pro League players